The 1952–53 Iowa State Cyclones men's basketball team represented Iowa State University during the 1952-53 NCAA College men's basketball season. The Cyclones were coached by Clay Sutherland, who was in his sixth season with the Cyclones. They played their home games at the Iowa State Armory in Ames, Iowa.

They finished the season 10–11, 5–7 in Big Seven play to finish in a tie for fourth place.

Roster

Schedule and results 

|-
!colspan=6 style=""|Regular Season

|-

References 

Iowa State Cyclones men's basketball seasons
Iowa State
Iowa State Cyc
Iowa State Cyc